Wolfmother is the debut extended play (EP) by Australian rock band Wolfmother. Recorded and mixed at Ghetto Studios in Detroit, it was released in Australia on 27 September 2004 and later in the United States and the United Kingdom. The EP was produced and mastered by Jim Diamond and mixed by bassist and keyboardist Chris Ross; the album cover was designed by drummer Myles Heskett. All four songs from Wolfmother were later re-recorded for the band's self-titled debut studio album; "Dimension", "Woman" and "White Unicorn" were also released as singles from the album.

Reception

The release of the Wolfmother EP began the consequently commonplace comparisons between the band and 1960s and 1970s rock artists, namely Black Sabbath. In a review for music website AllMusic, critic Eduardo Rivadavia summarised the record by saying "Wolfmother aren't claiming any measure of originality here -- they're just offering a form of time travel." He also said the following in his review:

Wolfmother's debut release was also a minor commercial success, reaching number 35 on the Australian ARIA Singles Chart.

Track listing
All songs were written by Andrew Stockdale, Chris Ross and Myles Heskett.
 "Dimension" – 4:07
 "Woman" – 2:43
 "Apple Tree" – 3:32
 "White Unicorn" – 7:44

Personnel
Wolfmother
 Andrew Stockdale – vocals, guitar
 Chris Ross – bass guitar, keyboards, mixing
 Myles Heskett – drums, artwork

Additional personnel
 Jim Diamond – production, mastering

Charts

References

 
 
 
 

Wolfmother albums
2004 debut EPs
Modular Recordings EPs